Chupke Chupke is a 1975 Indian Hindi-language comedy film. A remake of the Bengali film Chhadmabeshi, it was directed by Hrishikesh Mukherjee. It stars Dharmendra, Amitabh Bachchan, Sharmila Tagore, Jaya Bachchan, Om Prakash, Usha Kiran, David Abraham Cheulkar, Asrani and Keshto Mukherjee. The music was composed by S.D. Burman. This film is highly remembered for Dharmendra and Amitabh Bachchan's comic act which came in the same year when the all-time blockbuster Sholay was released.

Plot 
Professor Parimal Tripathi (Dharmendra) is a botany professor who falls in love with Sulekha Chaturvedi (Sharmila Tagore) during a women's college botany excursion. Prof. Parimal Tripathi helps the bungalow watchman to get to his village downhill to enable him to see his grandson who's fallen ill. Meanwhile, he disguises himself as the bungalow watchman to protect the old man's job. Sulekha finds out one day about the cover-up and is charmed on seeing Parimal's real personality. They both get married. Parimal loves playing pranks and is the antithesis of regular professors. Sulekha, on the other hand, is in awe of her jijaji (brother-in-law) Raghavendra (Om Prakash). She considers her jijaji to be highly intellectual and looks upon him as her idol. Parimal develops an inferiority complex thanks to Sulekha's excessive praise of her jijaji and decides to prove that he is in no way a lesser mortal. Jijaji, meanwhile, has written a letter to Haripad bhaiyya (David Abraham Cheulkar) asking him to send a driver who can speak good Hindi because his present driver James D'costa (Keshto Mukherjee) uses improper dialect. This provides the perfect opportunity for Parimal to get to see and interact with jijaji. Parimal becomes Pyare Mohan Ilahabadi, a motor-mouth driver who pretends to hate the English language and so speaks only Hindi. So begins the comedy of errors, as Parimal and Sulekha play prank after prank on the unsuspecting jijaji.

First they pretend that Sulekha is not happy with her new marriage, then they put across the impression that Sulekha is having an affair with Pyare Mohan, and if that was not enough, they get Parimal's long-time friend Sukumar Sinha (Amitabh Bachchan), a professor of English literature, to temporarily act as Parimal and portray him as a serious and boring lecturer, the complete opposite of Parimal's character. Pyare Mohan's excessively refined Hindi, his habit of correcting Jijaji's usage of the language and his persistence in getting jijaji to teach him English all serve to irk Jijaji to no end and provide for many laughs. Parimal's long-time friend P K Srivastava (Asrani) is also party to the prank. His sister-in-law Vasudha (Jaya Bachchan) suspects fake 'Parimal' - Sukumar Sinha - of infidelity to his wife 'Sulekha' when he tries to get close to her. Sukumar falls in love with Vasudha who at first believed he was Parimal, but Sukumar reveals to her the real drama behind all this mix-up of situations. Lata Srivastava (Lily Chakravarty), P.K. Srivastava's wife, is also angered over the latest 'extra-marital' love affair. But toward the end, Sukumar and Vasudha end up marrying in a temple where Haripat Bhaiyya coerces Pyare Mohan to 'kill' himself so that Parimal could surface. Thus jijaji comes to comprehend the whole enactment, finally admitting that he was truly fooled. The film revolves around the resolution of these funny mishaps.

Cast
 Dharmendra as Professor Parimal Tripathi / Pyare Mohan Allahbadi
 Amitabh Bachchan as Professor Sukumar Sinha (Kumar) / Professor Parimal Tripathi (Fake)
 Sharmila Tagore as Sulekha Chaturvedi
 Jaya Bachchan as Vasudha Kumar
 Om Prakash as Former Barrister Raghavendra Kumar Sharma (Raghav)
 Lily Chakravarty as Lata Kumar Srivastav
 Asrani as Prashant Kumar Srivastav
 David Abraham Cheulkar as Haripad Chaturvedi
 Keshto Mukherjee as James D'Costa, Driver
 Usha Kiran as Sumitra Sharma
 Vishal Desai (Mst. Titoo) as Ratna
 Aarti
 Amol Sen as Om Prakash's gatekeeper
 Harish Magon as Thief
 Chaitali
 Dev Kishan as Chowkidar at girls came for picnics  
 Lalita Sinha
 Nayana Apte
 Masterjee

Soundtrack

References

External links 
 

1975 films
Hindi remakes of Bengali films
1970s Hindi-language films
Films scored by S. D. Burman
Films directed by Hrishikesh Mukherjee
1975 comedy films
Films with screenplays by Gulzar
Indian comedy films
Hindi-language comedy films